Brandy Peak (also called Squirrel Mountain or Squirrel Peak) is an  summit in the Klamath Mountains of Curry County, Oregon in the United States.

See also
List of mountain peaks of Oregon

References

Mountains of Curry County, Oregon